BVC may refer to:

Schools
Bassingbourn Village College, a secondary school in Cambridgeshire, England
Bishop Viard College, Kenepuru, Porirua, New Zealand
Bottisham Village College, a secondary school in Cambridgeshire, England
Bow Valley College, a post-secondary institution in Calgary, Alberta, Canada
Bridgetown Vocational College, a secondary school in County Wexford, England

Sports
BVC Amsterdam, a Dutch football club
Bay Valley Conference, an athletic conference of the California Community College Athletic Association
Blanchard Valley Conference, a Northwest Ohio High School athletic conference

Stock exchanges
Caracas Stock Exchange, Venezuela
Colombia Stock Exchange
Bolsa de Valores de Cabo Verde, a stock exchange in Cape Verde
Bolsa de Valores de Colombia (bvc), a stock exchange in Colombia

Other
Bar Professional Training Course (the Bar Vocational Course pre-2010), a postgraduate course in England and Wales
The British Vacuum Council, a professional organization in the United Kingdom
Bushveldt Carbineers, an irregular unit in the 2nd Boer War

See also
 BVC '12, a football club from Beek, Netherlands